Curuçá River is a river of Amazonas state in northwestern Brazil. It is entirely within the municipality of Atalaia do Norte. Curuçá is a tributary of the Javary River.

1930 Curuçá River event 

On August 13, 1930, the area near latitude 5° S and longitude 71.5° W experienced a meteoric air burst, also known as the Brazilian Tunguska event.

See also 
 Curuçá
 List of rivers of Amazonas (Brazilian state)

References 

Rivers of Amazonas (Brazilian state)